Victory High School (now known as United High School) was a public high school in Clarksburg, West Virginia that operated from 1917 through 1973. Victory High School Consolidated along with Bristol High School and Salem High School into the new Liberty High School in 1973. This name was chosen as it was built during World War I and completed after the war was over.   The school operated until 2021 as Adamston Elementary School when it was closed after being consolidated with Wilsonburg Elementary into the newly renovated Victory Elementary located North of Clarksburg on Route 19, it was named in honor of the history of Victory High School, that building wa previously called Gore Middle School.  This building will continue operations as United High School, a alternate high school for troubled youth.

Colors and Mascot
 The school colors were black and orange.   They were known as the Victory Fighting Eagles.

 A contest was conducted in 1930 to pick a mascot to go along with VICTORY. The student that won was Joe Tipper from Adamston. At the time Joe was in his Jr. Year at VICTORY. He came up with the name “EAGLES”. Hence the name “VICTORY EAGLES” was born. His reward was an engraved plaque bearing his name and the mascot name. The plaque was encased in one of the trophy cases that adorned the main hallway at VICTORY.

Renovation
In 1998 a new bricked driveway was built in front to allow students to be dropped off and picked up in a safe environment. To cover the cost of this project, a brick wall was also established containing names of former Victory High Alumni, Faculty, Adamston Elementary Students and all veterans.  Bricks were sold from $20 to $50 and totally covered the cost of the project.

In 2022 the building was renovated to accommodate United High School.

Athletics
Two state basketball championships were won.  The first was by the 1933 team, coached by Farley Bell. The second team was coached by Howard "Doc" Hutson won in 1941.
Victory also won football state championships in 1925 and 1935.

World War II
Seventeen students died in the armed services during World War II.

Faculty
Full-time principals:
Fred V. Bouic (1919–1922)
E.A. Luzader (1922–1927)
Arthur V.G. Upton (1927–1929)
Henery L. Ash (1929–1937)
Lucy M. Bailey (1937–1950)
J. Edward Powell (1950–1966)
Glenn E. Willis (1966–1973)

References

Defunct schools in West Virginia
Educational institutions established in 1917
Education in Harrison County, West Virginia
Buildings and structures in Clarksburg, West Virginia
1917 establishments in West Virginia